Jeotgalibacillus malaysiensis is a Gram-positive, endospore-forming and rod-shaped bacterium from the genus of Jeotgalibacillus which has been isolated from seawater from the beach of Desaru in Malaysia.

References 

Bacillales
Bacteria described in 2015